India competed at the 1932 Summer Olympics in Los Angeles, United States. The Men's Field hockey team won their second consecutive gold.

Athletics 

4 Indian athletes, all men, competed across 5 events in the 1932 Olympics.

Aquatics

Swimming

One male athlete competed.

Field Hockey 
Due to the effects of The Great Depression and the cost of travel to the United States, only 3 Field Hockey teams ended up competing at the Olympics: India, Japan and the hosts, the USA. The event then took place as a short group stage competition, with each team playing each opponent once. To finance their travel, the Indian team played exhibition matches at every stop on their long journey by sea to Los Angeles. Once there, none of the teams even came close to the ability of the Indians, as Japan were beaten 11–1 and America were thrashed 24–1 on 11 August 1932, in the deciding game. The team even rotated the entire squad between games just so that all the players would get a medal. Dickie (Richard) Carr competed in both Field Hockey and the  events.

Team 
Richard Allen, Muhammad Aslam, Lal Bokhari (c), Frank Brewin, Richard Carr, Dhyan Chand, Leslie Hammond, Arthur Hind, Sayed Jaffar, Masud Minhas, Broome Pinniger, Gurmit Singh Kullar, Roop Singh, William Sullivan, and Carlyle Tapsell.

Results

Matches

Medalists

Gold
 Richard Allen, Muhammad Aslam, Lal Bokhari, Frank Brewin, Richard Carr, Dhyan Chand, Leslie Hammond, Arthur Hind, Sayed Jaffar, Masud Minhas, Broome Pinniger, Gurmit Singh Kullar, Roop Singh, William Sullivan, and Carlyle Tapsell.

References

Official Olympic Reports
International Olympic Committee results database
Indian hockey team's 1932 Olympics gold no less than a Hollywood blockbuster

Nations at the 1932 Summer Olympics
1932